Boris Efimovich Serebryakov (August 18, 1941 – 1971), known as The Kuybyshev Monster, was a Soviet serial killer, necrophile and mass murderer who operated in Kuybyshev (present-day Samara). He killed 9 people with special cruelty, caused two people serious bodily injury, and more than a dozen victims received from mild to moderate psychological disorders.

Biography 
Serebryakov was born on August 18, 1941, in Malgobek, in the Chechen-Ingush ASSR. Since childhood he showed criminal tendencies—possessing violent character and a craving for alcohol, repeatedly getting into fights with strangers, his colleagues and relatives, for which he was repeatedly detained by law enforcement. He also fell into the field of view of the police for inflicting bodily harm, theft, arson and rape, but his guilt could not be proven. In January 1967, after being demobilized from the ranks of the Soviet Army, he moved to Kuybyshev to his sister. He began work at the Kuybyshev Cable Plant.

On September 4, 1967, Serebryakov tried to rape Yekaterina Kharitonova, a dispatcher in one of the Kuybyshev tram depots. He rushed into the control room wearing only swimming trunks and with a knife in hand. The woman was stabbed in the neck and arm, but Serebryakov, frightened by her resistance, fled.

Serebryakov's first killings were committed on the night of April 27 to 28, 1969. He entered through a window into one of the living rooms of a 24-room one-story dormitory belonging to the Progress plant (now Litvinov) he killed Stepan Zorkin, his 5-year-old son Lyonya and his wife Maria by hitting them with a brick. After raping the dead woman, he stole 135 rubles and set fire to the deceased's clothes. Several rooms of the hostel were damaged from the fire, with suspicion falling on Maria's ex-husband.

The next crime Serebryakov committed was a year later. On the night of April 30, 1970, after entering an apartment on Aeroflot Street, he beat the landlady Ekaterina Kutsevalova and her daughter Olga with the bottom side of an axe he had taken with him. He began to rape the mother, thinking she was dead, but her daughter regained consciousness and started screaming, waking up the neighbors and frightening the attacker. Both of them survived. While searching for victims, Serebryakov traveled around the city on a bicycle "Ukraine". On the night of May 8 to 9, 1970, Serebryakov killed 70-year-old Praskovya Salova and 30-year-old Nina Vasilieva, with an axe. Soon a man named Timofeev came to the police, who claimed to have committed the murders, but verification proved that he was lying.

After that, panic ensued in Kuybyshev. In 1970, the USSR was supposed to hold elections for the Supreme Soviet of the USSR. Residents refused to let agitators into their apartments, even when accompanied by police officers, and directly stated: "Until the killer is caught, we will not vote."

On the night of June 4 to 5, 1970, in a house on Podgornaya Street, in the Oktyabrsky District near the Country Park, Serebryakov hacked to death the Malomanov family - father, mother and two children - with an axe. After violating the woman's corpse, the killer set fire to the house and fled on his bicycle.

Arrest 
On May 22, 1970, an investigative brigade was created, headed by General Igor Karpets. Militia patrols on the streets were reinforced, and the number of volunteers increased. Near one of the crime scenes a key to Serebryakov's bicycle with the brand of the Kharkov bicycle factory was found. After that, special attention was paid to cyclists.

On June 8, 1970, Serebryakov, who was riding a bicycle on a side street near the Airport Highway, was noticed by the druzhinnik Zagfar Gayfullin. He initially did not cause any suspicion, but when a gust of wind opened his cloak, his axe was seen, after which a chase began. Serebryakov jumped into the courtyard of a private house and hid himself in a street toilet. The druzhinnki, along with the owner of the house who was awakened by them, began to search the yard. One of the men, Victor Kochanov, opened the toilet and got a blow to the face, then a brick to the head. Serebryakov ran to the railway station "Internatnaya", near which at that time there was a freight train consisting of tanks and fuel oil. He climbed on the ladder of one of the tanks and wanted to leave by train, but was seen by one of the machinist's assistants, forcing him to run to the other side of the railway to the asphalt plant. There he climbed a tree and jumped off at the territory of the Progress Rocket Space Center. The alarm went off, and soon Serebryakov was detained by security guards of the plant, and then taken to the police. The attackers arrest took place a week before the election. The policeman who arrested the attacker was promoted two ranks, from senior lieutenant to major.

Serebryakov's fingerprints and blood type matched with the corresponding characteristics of the murderer, and in his room, stolen items from the victims were found. He soon confessed. The forensic psychiatric examination found that Serebryakov did not suffer from mental illness, and although he had obvious deviations in behavior, this did not become an obstacle to his criminal prosecution.

During the court hearing, people who could not fit in the hall looked through the windows, everyone wanted to see the man who had been holding the whole city in fear for almost a year and a half. In the fall of 1970, the Kuybyshev Regional Court sentenced Serebryakov to death. When they announced the verdict, those present in the audience applauded, and Serebryakov himself said: "I'll be back." All petitions for a pardon were rejected. In early 1971, Boris Serebryakov was executed in the Syzran Prison.

For the detention of the particularly dangerous criminal, all of the militiamen were awarded a medal for "an excellent service for the protection of public order".

See also
 List of Russian serial killers

References 

1941 births
1971 deaths
Executed mass murderers
Executed Soviet serial killers
Family murders
Male serial killers
Murderers of children
Necrophiles
People executed by the Soviet Union by firearm
People executed for murder
Serial mass murderers
Soviet mass murderers
Soviet rapists